The Belluliina are a subtribe of moths of the family Erebidae. The clade was described by Michael Fibiger in 2008.

Taxonomy
The subtribe was originally described as the subfamily Belluliinae of the family Micronoctuidae.

Clades (former tribes) and genera
Bellulia clade Fibiger, 2008
Bellulia Fibiger, 2008
Mediala clade Fibiger, 2008
Mediala Fibiger, 2008
Melaleucia Hampson, 1900

References

Micronoctuini
Lepidoptera subtribes